Guillermo "Memo" Diaz (born October 16, 1995) is an American professional soccer player who plays as a midfielder for USL Championship club Oakland Roots.

Career

College
Diaz began playing college soccer at Yavapai College in 2014, before moving to the University of Nevada, Las Vegas in 2016, where he played two further seasons of soccer.

Laredo Heat
Following college, Diaz played a season with National Premier Soccer League side Laredo Heat in 2018.

El Paso Locomotive
On February 21, 2019, Diaz signed for USL Championship side El Paso Locomotive ahead of their inaugural season.

Oakland Roots
On January 11, 2021, Diaz joined Oakland Roots ahead of their inaugural season in the USL Championship.

References

1995 births
Living people
UNLV Rebels men's soccer players
Laredo Heat players
El Paso Locomotive FC players
National Premier Soccer League players
USL Championship players
American soccer players
Association football midfielders
Soccer players from New Mexico
Oakland Roots SC players